Enemies is a 1940 German drama film directed by Viktor Tourjansky and starring Brigitte Horney, Willy Birgel and Reinhold Lütjohann. The film was a Nazi propaganda work, attacking Poland which Germany had invaded the year before. The film's sets were designed by Herbert Hochreiter, Alfred Metscher and Julius von Borsody.

Cast
 Brigitte Horney as Anna
 Willy Birgel as Keith
 Reinhold Lütjohann as Wegner
 Karl-Heinz Peters as Antek
 Arthur Fritz Eugens as Paul Wegner - Sohn
 Iván Petrovich as Jan
 Arnulf Schröder as Wladek
 Hedwig Wangel as Liska
 Carl Wery as Martin
 Beppo Brem as Wegereit
 Gerd Høst as Marianne Wegner, Tochter
 Nicolas Koline as Andreas
 Friedrich Ettel as Keller
 Ludwig Schmid-Wildy as Lessing
 Walter Holten as Böhme
 Hannes Keppler as Hans Martin
 José Held as Stach
 Peter Busse as Tischlergehilfe
 Paul Dahlke as Fährmann
 Maria Heil as Mutti, deutsche Flüchtlingsfrau
 Hans Benedikt
 Katharina Berger as Flüchtlingsfrau
 Heinz Burkhardt as Flüchtling
 Willy Cronauer as Pole in der Schenke
 Anita Düwell as Flüchtlingsfrau
 Walter Ebert-Grassow
 Franz Fröhlich
 Karl Gelfius as Kattwig, Flüchtling
 Fred Goebel as Pole in der Schenke
 Karl Hanft as Polnischer Wachtposten
 Walter Hillbring as Stefan
 Charles Willy Kayser as Flüchtling
 Walter Kindler
 Otto Kuhlmann
 Helmut Kutzner
 Emanuel Matousek as Pole in der Schenke
 Justus Paris as Pole in der Schenke
 Arthur Reinhardt as Ignaz
 Kurt Uhlig as Pole in der Schenke
 Werner Völger
 Dolf Zenzen as Pole in der Schenke

References

Bibliography

External links 
 

1940 films
Films of Nazi Germany
German drama films
1940 drama films
1940s German-language films
Films set in the 1930s
Films set in Poland
Films directed by Victor Tourjansky
Bavaria Film films
German black-and-white films
1940s German films